Sheena Sharp (born 13 April 1953) is a British sport shooter.

Career
Sharp started first shooting at the age of 11 before stopping at 16. Picking up the sport again over 20 years later, she progressed quickly and soon earn selection first with the Scottish and then the Great Britain team.

Attending her first Commonwealth Games in 2002, she won silver in the 50 m rifle prone pairs partnering with Susan Jackson. At the 2006 Commonwealth Games, Sharp and Jackson went one better and won gold in the same event. Sharp also won a second gold in the 50 m rifle prone singles event.

References

External links
 The 50m ISSF Championships, Scottish Smallbore Rifle Association
 
 

1953 births
Living people
Sportspeople from Aberdeenshire
Scottish female sport shooters
British female sport shooters
Commonwealth Games gold medallists for Scotland
Commonwealth Games silver medallists for Scotland
ISSF rifle shooters
Shooters at the 2002 Commonwealth Games
Shooters at the 2006 Commonwealth Games
Commonwealth Games medallists in shooting
Medallists at the 2002 Commonwealth Games
Medallists at the 2006 Commonwealth Games